"If I Could Turn Back the Hands of Time" is a song by American singer R. Kelly, released as the fifth single from his third album, R. (1998). The song is a ballad about a man wishing he could go back in time and repair his relationship with his girlfriend. The song peaked at number 12 on the US Billboard Hot 100 and became a top-10 hit across Europe, peaking at number one in Belgium, the Netherlands, and Switzerland.

Success and legacy
The song has sold 660,000 copies in the United Kingdom and is one of R. Kelly's biggest international hits, In Belgium, the song peaked at number one in both Flanders and Wallonia and is certified triple platinum for selling over 150,000 copies. The song was certified gold in the United States in October 2001. 

The song has been covered by several musicians, including Ed Sheeran and talent show contestants. Rapper Mims sampled the song for his debut album Music Is My Savior on the track "I Did You Wrong".

Live performances
Kelly did not perform this song very often, he performed this song for the first time on live television when he was in England on the show Top of the Pops. He seemed to perform this song more when he does a show in Europe than in the US, reason for that is that this song was highly successful there.

Charts and certifications

Weekly charts

Year-end charts

Decade-end charts

Certifications

Release history

References

R. Kelly songs
1990s ballads
1997 songs
1999 singles
Dutch Top 40 number-one singles
European Hot 100 Singles number-one singles
Music videos directed by F. Gary Gray
Number-one singles in Switzerland
Song recordings produced by R. Kelly
Songs written by R. Kelly
UK Independent Singles Chart number-one singles
Ultratop 50 Singles (Wallonia) number-one singles
Ultratop 50 Singles (Flanders) number-one singles